Hong Si-hoo is a South Korean professional footballer who plays as a midfielder for K League 1 side Incheon United.

Club career
Hong made his professional debut for K League 1 side Seongnam on 9 May 2020 against Gwangju. He came on as a 76th minute substitute for Choe Byeong-chan as Seongnam won 2–0.

Career statistics

Club

References

External links
 at the Incheon United FC website

2001 births
Living people
South Korean footballers
South Korea under-23 international footballers
Association football midfielders
Seongnam FC players
Incheon United FC players
K League 1 players
Footballers from Seoul